Dominic "Dom" Berry (born 13 June 1971) is a former Australian rules footballer who played with Hawthorn in the Australian Football League (AFL).

Berry, a key forward, spent most of his time at Hawthorn in the reserves competition. The Xavier College recruit appeared in just one senior AFL game, which came in round 14 of the 1992 AFL season, against the West Coast Eagles at Waverley Park. He later played for the Port Melbourne Football Club.

References

1971 births
Living people
Australian rules footballers from Victoria (Australia)
Hawthorn Football Club players
Port Melbourne Football Club players
Old Xaverians Football Club players